This page provides the summaries of the matches of the first two qualifying rounds for the group stage of the 2012 CAF Men's Pre-Olympic Tournament. These matches also serve as part of the qualifiers for the Football at the 2012 Summer Olympics to be held in London.

Seeding
In total, 39 teams opted to enter the qualifying tournament. The top 25 teams based on the qualifiers and final round of the previous Olympics were given byes to the first qualifying round.

Preliminary qualifying round

|}

Sierra Leone 2–2 Liberia on aggregate. Liberia won 3–1 on penalties

Sudan won 1–0 on aggregate

Botswana won 1–0 on aggregate

First qualifying round
The matches in the preliminary round were held on 25–27 March 2011 (first leg) and 8–10 April 2011 (second leg).

|}

Zambia won 3–0 on aggregate

Morocco won 3–2 on aggregate

Tanzania 3–3 Cameroon. Tanzania won 5–3 on penalties

Angola 1–1 Senegal. Senegal won on away goals rule

South Africa won 4–2 on aggregate 

Algeria won 4–0 on aggregate

Egypt won 3–2 on aggregate

Gabon won 5–2 on aggregate

Congo DR won 5–2 on aggregate

Côte d'Ivoire won 4–0 on aggregate

Tunisia won 3–0 on aggregate

Benin advance after The Gambia withdrew

Congo 1–1 Uganda. Congo won 4–2 on penalties

Guinea 2–2 Mali. Mali won on away goals rule

Nigeria won 9–1 on aggregate

Sudan won 2–1 on aggregate

Second qualifying round
The draw for the second qualifying round was held on April 13, 2011. CAF used FIFA rankings from March 2011 to seed the eight highest-ranked teams into Pot A.

Côte d'Ivoire's fixture against Liberia had been delayed until 20 April due to the civil unrest. As Ivory Coast are the 2nd highest-ranking team in Africa, the winner of their first qualifying round fixture was also placed in Pot A.

Seeding 
The pots were confirmed as follows:

Matches 
The draw was conducted on April 13 in Cairo, Egypt.

|}

Algeria won 3–2 on aggregate

Morocco won 3–2 on aggregate

Côte d'Ivoire won 3–1 on aggregate

Gabon won 1–0 on aggregate

Egypt won 2–0 on aggregate

South Africa 6–4 on aggregate

 
Senegal won 1–0 on aggregate

Nigeria 3–1 on aggregate

References

External links
 African Olympic qualifying results 

Qual